Ziqi Li (pinyin: Lǐ Zǐqī; born 6 July 1990), is a Chinese video blogger, entrepreneur, and Internet celebrity. She is known for creating food and handicraft preparation videos in her hometown of rural Pingwu County, Mianyang, north-central Sichuan province, southwest China, often from basic ingredients and tools using traditional Chinese techniques. Her YouTube channel has more than 2.7 billion views and 16 million subscribers, as verified on 21 August 2021, which is a Guinness World Record for "The most subscribers for a Chinese language channel on YouTube".

Early life
Li was born on 6 July 1990 in Sichuan, China, originally named "Li Jiajia". She was orphaned at a very young age. In an interview with Goldthread, Li stated that she moved in with her grandparents after her stepmother mistreated her.

Career
Li started posting her videos on Meipai in 2015. Initially, Li made her videos by herself, but her video editing skills at the time failed to "capture the creativity" she tried to express. In 2016, one of Li's videos titled Peach Wine caught the attention of a video-making platform CEO, who featured the video on the platform's front page, which soon elicited more followers for Li's channel. She released her first video to YouTube in 2017 with the title "Making a dress out of grape skins." As of June 2020, she had 11.7 million subscribers on YouTube, over 26.3 million followers on Sina Weibo, over 3.5 million followers on Facebook, and has inspired many bloggers to post similar content.

Her mainland audience includes urban millennials. Li's popularity may be attributed to fugu (retro-nostalgia), a growing appreciation in modern China for traditional culture. In an interview with Goldthread in September 2019, Li stated "I simply want people in the city to know where their food comes from."

A majority of Li's videos focus on traditional foods and antiques. Besides food preparation videos, other popular videos of Li's include creating makeup and dresses dyed with grape skins. Li rarely speaks in her videos, and the sounds of nature, cooking, and calm music are most prominent. Hemispheres magazine stated, "The only narration is friendly banter between Li and her grandmother, but the sounds—the singing of birds, the crunch of frost underfoot, the thwack of a cleaver, the sizzle of frying garlic—lure you into an ASMR trance, so you don't even notice how many videos you've binged."

In 2018, she launched a food brand under her own name and sold prepackaged food through e-commerce.

She was awarded the People's Choice Award by the Chinese Communist Party's official People's Daily newspaper in September 2019. In August 2020, Li was nominated as a member of the All-China Youth Federation. Li, along with Ms Yeah and Dianxi Xiaoge, are the only Chinese Internet celebrities who have reached international prominence.

2021 legal dispute 
Since her last video in July 2021, Li has put her vlogger career on hiatus due to a legal dispute with her business partners. On 27 October 2021, Li formally sued her content network Hangzhou Weinian. Although the dispute contents have not been publicized, various media suggested that it is related to commercialization of the Li Ziqi brand. A week prior, in an interview on state-run China Central Television (CCTV), Li stated that "she does not want to see her intellectual property over-commercialized." The Li Ziqi brand has been used by Weinian to sell food products. Weinian holds a 70% stake in one company, Guangxi Xingliu Food, that sells food using Li Ziqi branding, whereas Li herself does not hold any stake in the company.

Reception 
State-run CCTV praised her and stated "Without a word commending China, Li promotes Chinese culture in a good way and tells a good China story." Journalists have indicated that her videos may be viewed by some as a means of promoting Chinese government soft power.

Personal life
Li lives with her grandmother, who occasionally appears in videos, in the countryside of Mianyang in Southwest China's Sichuan. When Li was in fifth grade, her grandfather died. As a result, her grandmother was unable to pay for her education, and Li dropped out of school at the age of 14 to work in the city. She worked several jobs, including being a waitress (2016–2017), a disc jockey (2007–2013), and a singer (2006–2007). In 2012, she moved back to take care of her grandmother, who was sick at that time.

At the start, Li sold agricultural products on Taobao as a way to earn a living before moving on to be a blogger.

Li initially did all photography and editing by herself. As she gained popularity and experience, she produced her videos with the help of a personal assistant and a videographer.

Notes

References

External links
 

1990 births
Living people
Chinese bloggers
Chinese YouTubers
Mandarin-language YouTube channels
People from Mianyang
YouTube channels launched in 2017
YouTubers from Sichuan
Chinese women bloggers